Glen Vella (born 14 May 1983) is a Maltese singer. He started his singing career at the age of 13. He studied both practical and theory in voice and piano. He is certificated in voice coaching from the Victoria Music and Arts College London. Glen is a residential singer on various TV-shows on the island including 'Kalamita', 'Showtime', 'Sa 6' and 'Sibtijiet Flimkien'. He also played main roles in various musicals on the local stage, including 'Jesus Christ Super Star', 'Godspell', 'Abba Mania'.

He was the winner of the resurrected 2021 edition of Muzika Muzika with his song "Harsa Biss".

Eurovision Song Contest

Maltese national selections 
Glen Vella debuted in the Maltese selections for the Eurovision Song Contest in 2005 with the song "Appreciate". He tried to win the competition another three times, including a stint in 2009 with a short-lived group called Q. In 2011, Glen won the right to represent Malta in the Eurovision Song Contest. His song One Life, failed to reach the finals by one point. Again in November 2014, Glen participated in the Maltese national final for a chance to represent Malta in the Eurovision Song Contest 2015 in Austria with the song "Breakaway". He qualified to the Maltese final and finished in 3rd place with a total of 39 points, failing to win.

In 2022, he performed as a guest during the special night of the Malta Eurovision Song Contest 2022, the country's national selection for the Eurovision Song Contest 2022.

References

External links
Glen Vella at Malta Eurovision 2011

1983 births
Living people
21st-century Maltese male singers
21st-century Maltese singers
Eurovision Song Contest entrants for Malta
Eurovision Song Contest entrants of 2011
LGBT singers
Gay musicians
Maltese LGBT people
20th-century LGBT people
21st-century LGBT people